The Mercedes-AMG GT 4-Door Coupé is an executive car (E-segment) introduced in 2018 by Mercedes-AMG marketed as a five-door variant of the AMG GT two-door sports car.

Despite the name and style, the car is not based on the sports car, but rather on the E-Class (W213) and CLS-Class C257. Its performance chassis, however, is closely related to E63 wagon, and is featured by the AMG-specific rear frame and a different front axle for better kinematics.

Specifications 
The design of the GT 4-Door Coupé was mainly influenced by the Mercedes-Benz AMG GT Concept introduced a few years before series production. The AMG GT 4-Door Coupé uses a front-engine layout with rear-wheel-drive or 4MATIC+ fully variable all-wheel-drive (rear-biased), and is available with either a 3.0 L M256 turbo/supercharged inline-six engine or a 4.0 L M177 twin-turbocharged V8 engine. This system traces its roots back to the Mercedes CLS53. The car utilises the rear anti-roll bar to increase chassis stiffness, as well as active aero, including an electronically adjustable rear spoiler and electronically operated front louvers in the front grille, that can open and close to manage airflow through the radiator from the AMG GT R flagship sports car.

Variants

Mercedes-AMG GT 43 4MATIC+ & Mercedes-AMG GT 50 4MATIC+ 

The GT 43 and the GT 50 are the entry-level variants of the AMG GT 4-Door Coupé and both feature the same M256 3.0L Twincharged inline-six and the 4MATIC+ AWD system. The GT43 and GT50 are the same car (GT43 is the worldwide version, GT50 is the China only version)

Mercedes-AMG GT 53 4MATIC+ 
The GT 53 is the more powerful version of the GT 43. It features the same 3.0L turbo/supercharged inline-six, but with higher outputs. The suspension uses steel springs and adaptive dampers and the gearbox is a 9-speed unit that uses a conventional torque converter.
The GT53 can be optioned with the more aggressive "Aero Package". this package includes a more pronounced front splitter, with lager air vents to allow for more efficient cooling, combined with a deeper and larger rear diffusor and both fixed or movable (electronically) rear wing.

Mercedes-AMG GT 63 4MATIC+ 

The GT 63 also has an optional selectable "Drift Mode" which directs power solely to the rear wheels. The car comes standard with an electronically controlled limited-slip rear differential and rear-wheel steering, and features an MCT gearbox with a wet clutch to handle the extra power. The GT 63 uses AMG's multi-chamber air suspension for a sportier, more adaptive ride and has cylinder deactivation mode for increased efficiency.

Mercedes-AMG GT 63 S 4MATIC+ 

Additionally, all of the equipment and features from the GT 63, as well as the selectable "Drift Mode", which directs power solely to the rear wheels, comes as standard on the GT 63S as well.

Mercedes-AMG GT 63 S E-Performance

The GT 63 S E-Performance is an upcoming top-of-the-line, flagship variant of the GT 4-Door. It will be the first car to be launched under Mercedes’ new E Performance brand. It features the same 4.0L M177 Biturbo V8 engine, with the same electric motor powertrain as the Mercedes-Benz AMG GT Concept. The  sprint time can be achieved in less than three seconds. The powertrain will be named ‘V8 Biturbo E-Performance’.

References 

GT 4-Door Coupé
Cars introduced in 2018
2020s cars
Hatchbacks
All-wheel-drive vehicles
Vehicles with four-wheel steering
Full-size vehicles